Saint-Mars-sur-la-Futaie is a commune in the Mayenne department in north-western France. It is notable as the site of the oldest known tree in France, a Hawthorn growing alongside the church, and reputedly planted in the 3rd century.

See also
Communes of the Mayenne department

References

Saintmarssurlafutaie